VR Class Rro was a locomotive of Finnish origin. The Rro portion of the name comes from a word RautatieRakennusOsasto which is the Railway Construction Department.

The narrow gauge locomotive Rro 2 which is at the Finnish Railway Museum was originally used by TVH (the road engineering board) and numbered as TVH locomotive 5. Later (probably in 1926) it was transferred to VR Group and numbered 2 by the VR Railway Construction Department. The VR Railway Construction Department was established in the early 1920s.

Gallery

See also
 Finnish Railway Museum
 VR Group
 List of Finnish locomotives
 List of railway museums Worldwide
 Heritage railways
 List of heritage railways
 Restored trains
 Jokioinen Museum Railway
 History of rail transport in Finland

External links
Finnish Railway Museum
Steam Locomotives in Finland Including the Finnish Railway Museum
Photo of a Sister locomotive in use

References

Rro
Rro
Railway locomotives introduced in 1914
Narrow gauge railways in Finland
600 mm gauge railway locomotives
0-4-0 locomotives